Ivan and Matej Sabanov were the defending champions but lost in the quarterfinals to Matteo Arnaldi and Francesco Passaro.

Vladyslav Manafov and Oleg Prihodko won the title after defeating Fábián Marozsán and Lukáš Rosol 4–6, 6–3, [12–10] in the final.

Seeds

Draw

References

External links
 Main draw

San Benedetto Tennis Cup - Doubles
2022 Doubles